The yellow-faced whip snake (Demansia psammophis) is a species of venomous snake in the family Elapidae, a family containing many dangerous snakes. D. psammophis is endemic to Australia, found throughout the continent in a variety of habitats from coastal fringes to interior arid scrubland.

Taxonomy
The yellow-faced whip snake is part of the Demansia genus, a group of venomous snakes from the Elapidae family. This genus is composed of whip snakes, characterized by their large eyes and whip-like tail. The Demansia genus is commonly found in the Southern hemisphere around Australia and equatorial countries such as Papua New Guinea. 

There are currently 14 species that have been identified under the genus Demansia, these include:

Description
Demansia psammophis is a long thin snake with a narrow head. D. psammophis grows up to a total of 1m in length, averaging around 80cm in length, females being slightly smaller than males. Characterized by their narrow yellowish head, pale ring around the eyes, and a dark marking curving along the upper lip, D. psammophis becomes distinguishable from other Demansia snakes. Juveniles can be distinguished as a white-edged dark line is seen across the snout. The large prominent eyes surrounded by a pale ring, account for its ability to be a successful diurnal species, having the largest eyes of any Australian snake assisting in prey capture. The colour of yellow-faced whip snakes varies, ranging from olive green, grey and brown; however, a common characteristic in colour is a ‘red flush along the anterior third of its back'. 
 
To accurately identify this species, there must be a clear view of the head, and the scales around the snake's mid-body must be counted. D. psammophis has 15 midbody scale rows and between 165-230 ventrals, with the anal and subcaudals divided. 
Demansia psammophis is commonly confused with the eastern brown snake (Pseudonaja textilis), due to their similar appearance.

Distribution and habitat

Demansia psammophis are distributed throughout the Australian continent, with presence in every state except Tasmania. Although the distribution of D. psammophis is wide, it is endemic to Australia.
Found in a variety of habitats across Australia, Demansia psammophis ranges from coastal forests to arid scrublands and grasslands in Australia’s interior. 
It is not uncommon to find more than one D. psammophis as they are community dwellers. Habitats in rock crevices and under logs are common community habitats with communities often aggregating in winter months.

Behaviour
Demansia psammophis are diurnal reptiles, fast-moving with a nervous disposition, always alert and fleeing quickly when disturbed. The yellow-faced whip snake is subject to brumation, or slowing down their movements, in the winter months, usually only moving to seek sun and water.

Reproduction
Demansia psammophis are oviparous, laying clutches of 5-6 and 15-20 amniotic eggs. Communal egg laying is also common among the species, with some nests having between 500-600 eggs present. D. psammophis females experience vitellogenesis between September and November, ovulating in late spring or summer. Hatchlings are approximately 17cm in length from snout to base of tail and are laid between February and March.

Diet
Small diurnal lizards are the main source of food, as well as lizard eggs. D. psammophis, although diurnal, forage during the night, catching nocturnal forms such as geckoes, lerista and frogs.

Predation and Venom
Small reptiles such as lizards and skinks are predated on by D. psammophis, during the day. Juvenile D. psammophis have been observed to constrict their prey, however, as they become adults, constriction becomes uncommon, with the species occasionally creating a single body loop to restrain their prey. To immobilize and kill prey, D. psammophis lash out and inject toxic venom, slowing and eventually killing their prey.

Although this venom is deadly to other reptiles and amphibians, it is not considered dangerous to adults. If bitten, the bite will be painful and the injection of venom will cause localized pain and swelling, ranging from moderate to severe, with some bites causing systemic symptoms such as paralysis and bleeding. Medical treatment should be sought following any snake bite.

Conservation
Yellow-faced whip snakes are currently classified as least concern under the IUCN Red List and are considered stable.

The species is secure under the status of least concern in the majority of States and Territories in Australia, including QLD and the NT; however, they are considered near-threatened in Victoria.

D. psammophis is not found in Tasmania due to the Tasman Strait that separates it from mainland Australia and the climatic conditions of Tasmania.

References

Sources

 Weigel, John (2002). Australian Reptile Park's Guide to Snakes of South-east Australia... 
 Cotter, Harold G.(Oct 2018. Updated Seventh Edition.) “REPTILES AND AMPHIBIANS OF AUSTRALIA.”
. (Demansia psammophis, p. 50).
 "Demansia psammophis ". Integrated Taxonomic Information System. www.itis.gov.

Further reading
Boulenger GA (1896). Catalogue of the Snakes in the British Museum (Natural History). Volume III., Containing the Colubridæ (Opisthoglyphæ and Proteroglyphæ) ... London: Trustees of the British Museum (Natural History). (Taylor and Francis, printers). xiv + 727 pp. + Plates I-XXV. (Diemenia psammophis, pp. 322–323).
Schlegel H (1837). Essai sur la physionomie des serpens. Amsterdam: M.H. Schonekat. Partie générale, xxviii + 251 pp.; Partie descriptive, 606 + xvi pp. (Elaps psammophis, new species, p. 455). (in French).

Snakes of Australia
Demansia
Reptiles described in 1837
Reptiles of New South Wales